Ogembo is a small farming town in Kisii County, Kenya. Her inhabitants are the abagusii community. The town started around 1860 by the locals and around 1920s it became a commercial center for the Indians and a government centre for the colonial rule in the area. The surrounding area is well known for banana farming and tea farming. Ogembo is located 380 km  west of Nairobi and has a population of 20,000.

It is located within the Roman Catholic Diocese of Kisii.

Ogembo, Kenya was featured in a November 2017 episode of American television show Dr. Phil.

Kisii County
Populated places in Nyanza Province